Events in the year 2002 in Germany.

Incumbents
President – Johannes Rau 
Chancellor – Gerhard Schröder

Events

 6-17 February - 52nd Berlin International Film Festival
 22 February: Germany in the Eurovision Song Contest 2002
 26 April: Erfurt massacre
 8 June – 15 September : Documenta11
 30 June: The Völkerstrafgesetzbuch goes into effect.
 1 July: Überlingen mid-air collision
 10 July: Swiss International Air Lines Flight 850
 August: 2002 European floods
 22 October: The Second Schröder cabinet led by Gerhard Schröder was sworn in.
 16 December: Berlin Plus agreement
 Date unknown:
 German construction company Philipp Holzmann is defunct.
 JCNetwork student consultancy is founded.
 NanoAndMore, a nanotechnology distributor is founded.

Elections

 2002 German federal election
 2002 Mecklenburg-Vorpommern state election
 2002 Saxony-Anhalt state election

Births 

 26 October - Emma Schweiger, actress

Deaths

 27 January - Franz Meyers, German politician (born 1908)
 1 February - Hildegard Knef, German actress (born 1925)
 8 February - Joachim Hoffmann, German historian (born 1930)
 11 March - Marion Dönhoff. German journalist (born 1909)
 13 March - Hans-Georg Gadamer, German philosopher (born 1900)
 3 April - Heinz Drache, German actor (born 1923)
 9 April - Thomas Dinger, German musician (born 1952)
 2 May - Richard Stücklen, German politician (born 1916)
 4 May - Rolf Friedemann Pauls, German diplomat (born 1915)
 2 June - Konrad Wirnhier, German sport shooter (born 1937)
 13 June - John Herberger, German football player and coach (born 1919)
 17 June - Fritz Walter, German football player (born 1920)
 22 June - Frank Ripploh, German actor and film director (born 1949)
 29 June - Alfred Dregger, German politician (born 1920)
 25 July - Johannes Joachim Degenhardt, Archbishop of Paderborn (born 1926)
 30 August - Horst Wendlandt, German film director (born 1922)
 14 October - Norbert Schultze, German film composer (born 1911)
 23 October - Marianne Hoppe, German actress (born 1909)
 7 November - Rudolf Augstein, German journalist (born 1923)
 3 December - Klaus Löwitsch, German actor (born 1936)
 6 December - Gerhard Löwenthal, German journalist (born 1922)
 31 December - Jürgen Dethloff, German engineer (born 1924)

See also
2002 in German television

References

 
Years of the 21st century in Germany
2000s in Germany
Germany
Germany